Virgo Indigo is the second full-length studio album from the Newfoundland and Labrador based lo-fi music project Fog Lake. Self-produced by Aaron Powell, the album was released on February 4, 2014 through Brooklyn-based label Orchid Tapes.

Background
After 2013's Farther Reaches gained minor traction through the title track's placement on YouTube channel Majestic Casual and working with cassette-based DIY label Birdtapes, Powell began working on new material that would become Virgo Indigo. By the end of that year, the album was completed: almost the entirety of it having been produced in his St. John's apartment. Featuring a heavily ambient, dream-pop atmosphere, the album would produce one single, It Was Never Enough which premiered on The FADER and No Fear of Pop.

Track listing
 "Fading Away" – 1:54
 "Virgo Indigo" – 2:28
 "Mad Scientist" – 2:03
 "It Was Never Enough" – 2:54
 "Erik" – 2:49
 "Transcanada" – 4:40
 "Little Black Balloon" - 2:09
 "Dream Gate" – 2:57
 "Nocturnal Blues" – 2:39
 "Pretty Lights" – 1:46
 "Circuit Rider" - 3:23
 "Lost Love Letters" - 3:02

Personnel
 Aaron Powell – music, lyrics, recording
 Warren Hildebrand - mastering

References

2014 albums
Fog Lake albums